Yuri Semenovich Lazurkin (1916 - August 5, 2009) was a Russian physicist and a founder of a new discipline DNA physics.

Scientific career
Lazurkin started his career in a novel field polymer physics. During World War II, he was in the Navy and worked on demagnetizing of ships.

After the war, he returned to polymer physics. One of the phenomenons that his laboratory studied and greatly contributed to its understanding, was DNA melting.

References

Sources

External links
 Yuri Semenovich Lazurkin at MPTI Biology

1916 births
2009 deaths
Russian biologists
Academic staff of the Moscow Institute of Physics and Technology
Soviet inventors
Soviet physicists
20th-century biologists